The 1988 Los Angeles Rams season was the franchise's 51st season in the National Football League, their 41st overall, and their 43rd in the Greater Los Angeles Area. The team improved on a disappointing 6–9 record the previous year, going 10–6 and qualifying as a Wild Card before losing to the Minnesota Vikings in the NFC Wild Card game.

Roster

Regular season 

1988 Team Starters

Offense

 11 Jim Everett            QB
 42 Greg Bell              RB
 24 Buford McGee           FB
 80 Henry Ellard           WR
 84 Aaron Cox              WR
 86 Damone Johnson         TE

 75 Irv Pankey             LT
 66 Tom Newberry           LG
 56 Doug Smith             C
 67 Duval Love             RG
 78 Jackie Slater          RT

Defense

 93 Doug Reed              LDE
 99 Alvin Wright           NT
 98 Shawn Miller           RDE

 91 Kevin Greene           LB
 55 Carl Ekern             LB
 59 Mark Jerue             LB
 54 Mike Wilcher           LB

 25 Jerry Gray             CB
 47 LeRoy Irvin            CB
 23 Michael Stewart        SS
 20 Johnnie Johnson        FS

Kicking Team

 1 Mike Lansford           K
 3 Rich Camarillo          P
 28 Cliff Hicks            PR
 89 Ron Brown              KR

Schedule

Season summary

Week 4

Standings

Playoffs

Awards and records 
 Greg Bell, NFL Leader, Touchdowns, 31 TD's 
 Greg Bell, NFL Comeback Player of the Year
 Jerry Gray, NFC Pro Bowl selection
 Pete Holohan, Franchise Record, most receptions by a tight end (59)

See also 
Other Anaheim–based teams in 1988
 California Angels (Anaheim Stadium)
 1988 California Angels season

External links 
 1988 Los Angeles Rams Season at Pro-Football Reference

References 

Los Angeles Rams
Los Angeles Rams seasons
Los Ang